John Gay (died March 4, 1688) was a prominent early settler and selectman in Dedham, Massachusetts.

Gay emigrated to America about 1630. He settled first in Watertown, Massachusetts and was a grantee in the Great Dividends and in the Beaver Brook plowlands, owning altogether forty acres. He was admitted freeman on May 6, 1635. With his wife, Joanna, he had 11 children.

With others of Watertown, he was one of the founders of the plantation of Dedham, Massachusetts. He was one of those who petitioned for incorporation of the town on September 6, 1636 and signed the Dedham Covenant. He served as selectmen in 1654 and in a variety of other positions, including constable and member of the county grand jury.

In 1661, Gay was the richest man in Dedham. His wealth dwindled in his later years, though, with much of it likely going to his sons, until he was in near poverty at the time of his death. Gay died March 4, 1688. His will in the Suffolk records was dated December 18, 1686 and was proved December 17, 1689. His estate was valued at £91 5s 8d.

Notes

References

Works cited

Dedham, Massachusetts selectmen
Kingdom of England emigrants to Massachusetts Bay Colony
Signers of the Dedham Covenant
1688 deaths
Year of birth missing